Imyanovo (İmän) is a rural locality (a village) in Norkinsky Selsoviet, Baltachevsky District, Bashkortostan, Russia. The population was 169 as of 2010. There are 5 streets.

Geography 
Imyanovo is located 20 km south of Starobaltachevo (the district's administrative centre) by road. Nacharovo is the nearest rural locality.

References 

Rural localities in Baltachevsky District